England competed at the 1962 British Empire and Commonwealth Games in Perth, Western Australia, from 22 November to 1 December 1962.

Athletics

Medalists

Events
Men
Track & road events

Field events

Women
Track events

Field events

Bowls

Boxing

Cycling

Diving

Fencing

Rowing

Swimming

Weightlifting

Wrestling

See also
 Great Britain at the 1960 Summer Olympics
 Great Britain at the 1964 Summer Olympics

References

1962
Nations at the 1962 British Empire and Commonwealth Games
British Empire and Commonwealth Games